Maude Turner Gordon (November 10, 1868 – January 12, 1940) was an American actress who appeared in 81 films between 1914 and 1938.

Biography
Born in Franklin, Indiana, Gordon was the daughter of Alexander and Nancy Wright Turner. She was educated in the schools in Franklin.

In the early 1900s, Gordon performed in repertory theatre with the Neill Stock Company in California.

She appeared in a number of Broadway productions from 1908 to 1925 including: Glorious Betsy, The American Maid, A Full House, Elsie, and Big Boy. She appeared onstage in Mrs. Holmes, Detective, which was produced by her own company.

Her elder sister, Emma Harper Turner, served as Grand President of Pi Beta Phi, from 1890 to 1893. Another sister, Nelle Turner, was a member of Pi Beta Phi fraternity for women.

Family
She eloped and married John C. Gordon on December 19, 1885, in Johnson County, Indiana. Their daughter, Dorothy, an alumna of the Fauquier Institute of Warrenton, Virginia, married Lt. Robert A. White of the U.S. Navy in 1916.

Death
On January 12, 1940, Gordon died from pneumonia in Los Angeles, California, aged 71. She was survived by a sister.

Selected filmography

 The Kreutzer Sonata (1915)
 Miss George Washington (1916)
 The Honeymoon (1917)
 Her Better Self (1917)
 The Lie (1918)
 The Service Star (1918)
 The Danger Mark (1918)
 The Turn of the Wheel (1918)
 The Ordeal of Rosetta (1918)
 Just for Tonight (1918)
 The Divorcee (1919)
 Away Goes Prudence (1920)
 Civilian Clothes (1920)
 Beyond Price (1921)
 The Price of Possession (1921)
 Enchantment (1921)
 Women Men Marry (1922)
 Homeward Bound (1923)
 Born Rich (1924)
 The Little French Girl (1925)
 The Early Bird (1925)
 The Palm Beach Girl (1926)
 Cheating Cheaters (1927)
 The Wizard (1927)
 Home Made (1927)
 Hot News (1928)
 Glad Rag Doll (1929) 
 The Hottentot (1929)
 The Marriage Playground (1929)
 Sally (1929)
 High Stakes (1931)
 Back Street (1932)
 Shopworn (1932) 
 She Loves Me Not (1934)
 Living on Velvet (1935)

References

External links

 
 

1868 births
1940 deaths
American film actresses
American silent film actresses
American theatre managers and producers
Actresses from Indiana
Deaths from pneumonia in California
20th-century American actresses
People from Franklin, Indiana